was a Japanese ultranationalist political theorist, Pan-Asianist, and martial artist, active in the pre-war Empire of Japan.

Biography
Uchida was born in Fukuoka prefecture. He was the son of Shinto Muso-ryu practitioner Uchida Ryōgorō, and from an early age was interested in many forms of Japanese traditional martial arts, including kyūdō, kendo, judo and sumo. In 1895, he attended the Toyogo University, where he studied the Russian language and in 1897, made a trip to Siberia.

As a youth, Uchida joined the Genyosha nationalist group, and soon became the leading disciple of its founder, Toyama Mitsuru. The Genyosha was active in raising funds and agitating for a more aggressive foreign policy towards the Asian mainland. When the Donghak Rebellion began in Korea in 1894, he went to Korea to help the rebels.

After his return to Japan, in 1901, he founded the Black Dragon Society, an ultranationalist society which advocated a strong foreign policy towards Russia and Japanese expansionism towards Korea and Manchuria. In 1903, he joined the Tairo Doshikai, a political group advocating war against Russia. After the successful conclusion of the Russo-Japanese War, he turned his attention towards advocating the annexation of Korea. He was one of the sponsors of the pro-Japanese Iljinhoe political party in Korea in 1907. During the 1920s and 1930s, he was active in attacking liberalism in Japanese society and politics. He was arrested in 1925 on suspicion of planning the assassination of Japanese Prime Minister Takaaki Kato and the Emperor of Japan, Emperor Yoshihito, but was found innocent.

References

1873 births
1955 deaths
People from Fukuoka Prefecture
Shinto Muso-ryu
Japanese jojutsuka
Japanese fascists
Pan-Asianists